Svalsta (local pronunciation Sválsta) is a locality situated in Nyköping Municipality, Södermanland County, Sweden with 1,078 inhabitants in 2010.

References 

Populated places in Södermanland County
Populated places in Nyköping Municipality